METTL26, previously designated C16orf13, is a protein-coding gene for Methyltransferase Like 26, also known as JFP2. Though the function of this gene is unknown, various data have revealed that it is expressed at high levels in various cancerous tissues. Underexpression of this gene has also been linked to disease consequences in humans.

Gene 

METTL26 is located on the short arm of chromosome 16 in humans, in the thirteenth open reading frame. There are five transcript variants of this gene, named 1, 2, 3, 4, and 7. The longest cDNA transcript (transcript variant 1) contains 854 base pairs. This transcript is composed of six exons, all of which contribute to the major superfamily included in the protein, the methyltransferases superfamily. The primary transcript of this gene is 1,919 base pairs long.

Species distribution 

Using the Dotlet program, a dot plot was constructed comparing the Human gene with its Chimpanzee ortholog.

The plot indicates sequence conservation at the beginning and end of the gene, suggesting conservation and similarity in the 5' and 3' untranslated regions.

This sequence similarity in the 5’ UTR and 3’ UTR does not extend past mammalian species, and shows almost no similarity in a Dot Plot of the Human gene with distantly related species, such as Xenopus tropicalis.

A multiple sequence alignment conducted using the SDSC Biology Workbench  reveals little sequence similarity among species more distantly related than primates in the upstream region of the gene. Near the start of transcription site in the human C16orf13 gene, there is high conservation among the primates in which upstream data was available, specifically the human, orangutan, and rhesus monkey C16orf13 gene orthologs. High sequence similarity among primates is evident throughout the promoter region, the 5' UTR, and the C16orf13 gene.

The graph below shows selected gene orthologs for C16orf13 transcript variant 1. These data are collected from NCBI BLAST.

Tissue distribution 
The human expression profile from NCBI UniGene suggests that this gene has widespread expression in many different tissues in the body. This expression profile suggests that this gene is a “housekeeping gene,” one that has important effects in all cells, regardless of tissue. The highest levels of expression appear to be in the adrenal gland, lung, and parathyroid. There are many additional sites besides these highest three where the gene is expressed in high levels. There seems to be no real similarity in the few tissues where the gene is not expressed. This expression data does not seem to give any clues into specific function, except to suggest that the gene is involved in a “housekeeping” function of nearly all cells.

Gene neighborhood 

The C16orf13 gene is located near the end of chromosome 16, potentially subject to deletion mutations.

The surrounding genes of the C16orf13 gene include hypothetical protein LOC100287175 and LOC100138285 to
the right and RAB40C and WFIKKN1 to the left. This gene is located on the minus strand, along with
LOC100138285. The other surrounding genes are oriented in the opposite way on the plus strand. The gene
neighborhood is represented in the schematic below, originally from NCBI Gene.

Protein 
The protein that this gene codes for is known as UPF0585, where UPF signals unknown protein function. There are five isoforms of this protein, corresponding to the five splice variants of the gene. The isoforms are named a, b, c, d, and g As mentioned above, the conserved domain detected in a BLAST search of this amino acid sequence is a methyltransferase superfamily.

Conservation 
A multiple sequence alignment conducted using the protein tools in the SDSC Biology Workbench  reveals some sequence similarity among distantly related protein orthologs, as far back as archaea, in the region known to code for the methyltransferase domain. The methyltransferase superfamily portion of the protein appears more highly conserved among many of the more closely related orthologous proteins in a diverse array of species.

Species distribution 
The C16orf13 has homologs in many species, including distant orthologs in fungi and plants. There are no known paralogs of this protein This gene and its protein are very highly conserved in primates and mammals, particularly in the functional methyltransferase domain.

The graph below shows selected protein orthologs for C16orf13 transcript variant 1. These data are collected from NCBI BLAST.

Predicted properties 

The protein secondary structure can be predicted using algorithms to predict the occurrence of alpha helices and beta sheets within the protein. An analysis of the protein structure was conducted using the CHOFAS, GOR4, and PELE algorithms in the SDSC Biology Workbench. The analyses were combined and included in the adjacent diagram. Only structures that appeared in more than one output were included.

Interactions 
There are few known interactions for this protein. No interactions were found in the GeneCards database or in the MINT database. A STRING search resulted in two gene outputs. These two gene interactions, though, are both in the evidence category of gene neighborhood, which does not necessarily suggest that these genes are interacting in any meaningful way, or are even expressed at the same time.
There is no strong evidence, currently, for interactions with this protein.

Disease linkage 
Data from microarray experiments has linked over expression of this gene to cancer in various tissues, particularly breast and gastric cancer. In addition, under expression of this gene is also linked to disease, particularly connective tissue disease, nutritional and metabolic disorders, and digestive disorders. The canSAR Workbench database reveals microarray data that may link over or under expression of the C16orf13 gene to various carcinomas

References 

Genes on human chromosome 16